Middle Rainton was a small hamlet between West Rainton and East Rainton in the City of Sunderland, north east England. It was subject to a schedule D notice and hence ceased to exist in the 1970s. The site of Middle Rainton is now a Nature Reserve open to the Public.

Villages in Tyne and Wear
City of Sunderland